Aleksandr Ivanovich Maksimenkov (17 August 1952 – 7 September 2012) was a Soviet football player and a Russian coach.

International career
Maksimenkov made his debut for USSR on 20 March 1977, scoring in a friendly match against Tunisia. He played in the 1978 FIFA World Cup qualifiers and in one UEFA Euro 1980 qualifier (the USSR did not qualify for the final tournament for either).

Honours
 Soviet Top League winner, spring 1976
 Soviet Cup winner, 1977

References

External links
  Profile

1952 births
2012 deaths
People from Pochinok
Russian footballers
Soviet footballers
Soviet Union international footballers
Soviet Top League players
FC Torpedo Moscow players
FC Dynamo Moscow players
Russian football managers
Association football midfielders
FC Iskra Smolensk players
Russian expatriate football managers
Sportspeople from Smolensk Oblast